Triệu Việt Vương (Chữ Nôm 趙越王, 524–571), born Triệu Quang Phục (趙光復), was a king of the Vietnamese Early Lý dynasty in the 6th century. He was co-ruler alongside Lý Thiên Bảo from 548 until Lý Thiên Bảo's death in 555, upon which Triệu Việt Vương  became sole king until his death in 571. Unlike the other rulers of the early Lý Dynasty, Triệu Việt Vương did not belong to the Lý family, and instead obtained his high position by being the commanding general of Vạn Xuân , where he was best known for leading a resistance against the Liang dynasty that tried to regain Vạn Xuân. He was a pioneer in waging guerrilla war tactics.

Early life
Little is recorded about Triệu Việt Vương's (born Triệu Quang Phục) early life other than the fact that he was the son of Triệu Tục, a senior military leader under Lý Nam Đế. He was born in 26 January 524 in Zhu Jian (today Hưng Yên province).

Rise to power

During the 530s, Vietnam was a province of the Chinese Liang dynasty. It was governed by Xiao Zi (蕭諮), a nephew of the Liang emperor. Xiao Zi's rule was marked by corruption and cruelty.  In late 540, a local magistrate, Lý Bôn rallied local Việt officials and soldiers to support his cause for independence. Among them was Triệu Tục, who joined them because he too tired of Xiao Zi's incompetence. Lý Bôn's forces sacked the provincial capital Long Biên (now Hanoi) within months in the spring of 541. Xiao Zi managed to escape back to the Liang dynasty.   In 544, Lý Bí announced Vietnam's secession from the Liang empire and proclaimed himself emperor of Vạn Xuân.

After hearing news of the rebellion, Emperor Wu, the Liang Emperor, sent an army southward in attempt to crush the rebellion led by Lý Bí. Lý Bôn made use of tactical withdrawals against the Liang forces, who were defeated by Lý's army according to historical Chinese sources.  In 548, Lý Bôn was killed by Lǎo (ms. 獠) tribesmen (a Tai-Kadai ethnic group) while on retreat from the Hong River Plain. Facing inevitable defeat and dwindling military supplies, Triệu Túc realized he could not endure the long campaign and therefore he appointed his trusted son Triệu Quang Phục to lead the resisting forces after the emperor's death. By this time, Triệu Quang Phục had followed his father's footsteps as a notable resistance leader in the Hong River Plain.

Resistance against the Liang dynasty
Recognizing the superior strength of the Liang army, Triệu Quang Phục often retreated to more favorable terrain, mainly in the swamps and marshlands. He stationed his army in the forests for tactical advantage, where he was able to employ guerrilla warfare and wage a war of attrition against the Liang army.  Triệu would rest his army during the day and attack the Liang army at night, seizing goods and killing many Chinese soldiers. Afterwards, he would quickly retreat back to his stronghold  before the Chinese could reassemble their army to counter-attack.

After the assassination of Lý Nam Đế in 548, his elder brother, Lý Thiên Bảo, became the de facto ruler of Vạn Xuân.  Lý Thiên Bảo died of an illness in 555 and left no heirs, which prompted the military and officials to elect Triệu Quang Phục as leader and de facto ruler. He took the regnal name Triệu Việt Vương. However, his election was not undisputed as other prominent family members of Lý Nam Đế challenged Triệu Quang Phục's leadership. While Triệu Quang Phục claimed rightful succession through the approval of court officials, military, and the general populace, the Lý family claimed rightful leadership through primogeniture as they were still considered the rightful ruling family.

As strong as the Chinese were, they could not make any headway against Triệu Quang Phục's style of warfare This indecisive period lasted until 557 when finally a respite came for the Lý forces. Hou Jing revolted against the Liang dynasty and the leading Liang general in Vietnam, Chen Batian was recalled back to China to help quell the revolt. The Vietnamese forces, however, had no time to rejoice at the news of this temporary respite.

Civil war
Shortly after Lý Thiên Bảo died, his cousin Lý Phật Tử claimed the imperial throne and challenged Triệu Việt Vương. A civil war broke out for the throne with no decisive victory. Wary about engaging in internal fighting that would only frustrate the people, Triệu Việt Vương sued for peace. Subsequently all the lands north of Long Biên would be under Lý Phật Tử's rule and the land south of Long Biên would belong to Triệu Việt Vương.

In 571, Lý Phật Tự broke the truce and attacked Triệu Quang Phục's domain. Since Triệu Quang Phục's domain was not prepared for this assault they were easily defeated. His capital was sacked and burned by Lý Phật Tự's forces, however he managed to escape. During his retreat, Triệu Quang Phục committed suicide. Triệu Quang Phục's remaining forces and territories surrendered and were incorporated into Lý Phật Tự's domains.

Notes

References
 Taylor, Keith Weller. (copyright 1983). The Birth of Vietnam. Berkeley: University of California Press. 
 Woods, Shelton. (copyright 2002). Vietnam: An Illustrated History. Hippocrene Books, Inc. 
 Tran Trong Kim. (1953). Viet Nam Su Luoc.

Early Lý Dynasty Kings
524 births
571 deaths
6th-century monarchs in Asia
Year of birth unknown
6th-century Vietnamese people
Vietnamese monarchs